Delta Park/Vanport is a light rail station on the MAX Yellow Line in Portland, Oregon. It is the 9th stop northbound on the Interstate MAX extension and is in the area of Delta Park, formerly the site of the city of Vanport.  It is located between Portland International Raceway on the west and Interstate 5 on the east and is at the north end of the Vanport Bridge, which spans the Columbia Slough and an industrial area.

The station platforms are to the sides of the tracks.  Beyond them are two park and ride lots to the west and bus bays connected to an I-5 off-ramp to the east.  As of 2018, one C-Tran bus route and one TriMet bus route serve this station.

Artwork at the station references the 1948 Vanport Flood, even utilizing bronzed artifacts found on the construction site.

Bus line connections

As of 2018, Delta Park/Vanport MAX station is served by two bus routes:
TriMet route 6 - Martin Luther King Jr. Blvd. (southbound trips only)
C-Tran route 60 - Delta Park Limited (operating all day, seven days a week)

Bus service history
When the station opened in 2004, there was no regular bus service to it; however, C-Tran did use the bus bays during winter storms instead of providing through service to downtown Portland. In 2007, C-Tran began regularly serving the station for the first time. Three limited-stop "commuter" (rush hours only) routes (41, 44 and 47) served the station starting in May 2007, connecting it with Vancouver and other points in Clark County.  Another route was added in September 2007, prompted by TriMet's discontinuation, on September 2 of that year, of the portion of its route 6-ML King Blvd between Jantzen Beach and downtown Vancouver. C-Tran began operating a temporary shuttle between Delta Park/Vanport MAX station and downtown Vancouver, replacing it with permanent service – with a regular, all-day route (4-Fourth Plain) – in November 2007. 

Routes 4-Fourth Plain and 44-Fourth Plain Limited stopped serving the station in September 2016, and route 47-Battle Ground Limited's service to the station was discontinued in September 2017.

TriMet bus service (route 6, southbound trips only) to this station was introduced in September 2017.

References

External links

Station information (with northbound ID number) from TriMet
Station information (with southbound ID number) from TriMet
MAX Light Rail Stations – more general TriMet page
Park & Ride Locations – TriMet page

2004 establishments in Oregon
Delta Park Vanport
MAX Yellow Line
North Portland, Oregon
Railway stations in Portland, Oregon
Railway stations in the United States opened in 2004